In mathematical finite group theory, a rank 3 permutation group acts transitively on a set such that the stabilizer of a point has 3 orbits. Several of the sporadic simple groups were discovered as rank 3 permutation groups.

Classification
The primitive rank 3 permutation groups are all in one of the following classes:

 classified the ones such that  where the socle T of T0 is simple, and T0 is a 2-transitive group of degree .
 classified the ones with a regular elementary abelian normal subgroup
 classified the ones whose socle is a simple alternating group
 classified the ones whose socle is a simple classical group
 classified the ones whose socle is a simple exceptional or sporadic group.

Examples
If G is any 4-transitive group acting on a set S, then its action on pairs of elements of S is a rank 3 permutation group. In particular most of the alternating groups, symmetric groups, and Mathieu groups have 4-transitive actions, and so can be made into rank 3 permutation groups.

The projective general linear group acting on lines in a projective space of dimension at least 3 is a rank-3 permutation group.

Several 3-transposition groups are rank-3 permutation groups (in the action on transpositions).

It is common for the point-stabilizer of a rank-3 permutation group acting on one of the orbits to be a rank-3 permutation group. This gives several "chains" of rank-3 permutation groups, such as the Suzuki chain and the chain ending with the Fischer groups.

Some unusual rank-3 permutation groups (many from ) are listed below.

For each row in the table below, in the grid in the column marked "size", the number to the left of the equal sign is the degree of the permutation group for the permutation group mentioned in the row. In the grid, the sum to the right of the equal sign shows the lengths of the three orbits of the stabilizer of a point of the permutation group. For example, the expression 15 = 1+6+8 in the first row of the table under the heading means that the permutation group for the first row has degree 15, and the lengths of three orbits of the stabilizer of a point of the permutation group are 1, 6 and 8 respectively.

Notes

References

Finite groups